The 2016 Women's County One-Day Championship was the 20th cricket Women's County Championship season. The Championship was won by Kent who recorded their seventh championship, setting a new record for the number of championships won. The runners-up were Sussex.

This was the last season in which Division 4 was contested. Following a reorganisation of the structure of the tournament, all the teams in Division 4 were promoted to an expanded Division 3 in 2017. In early 2016, Ireland team withdrew from the competition, causing fixtures to be rescheduled and Division 2 with one fewer team.

Competition format 
The championship worked on a points system, the winner being the team with most average points of completed games in the first division. The points are awarded as follows:

Win: 10 points + bonus points. 
Tie:  5 points + bonus points. 
Loss: Bonus points.
Abandoned or cancelled: Match not counted to average.

Bonus points are collected for batting and bowling.  The bonus points for each match are retained if the match is completed.

Batting

1.50 runs per over (RPO) or more: 1 point
2 RPO or more: 2 points
3 RPO or more: 3 points
4 RPO or more: 4 points

Bowling

3-4 wickets taken: 1 point
5-6 wickets taken: 2 points
7-8 wickets taken: 3 points
9-10 wickets taken: 4 points

Teams 
The 2016 Championship was divided into four divisions: Division One with nine teams, Division Two with eight teams due to Ireland withdrawing, Division Three with nine teams, and Division Four with eleven teams across two groups.

Teams in each group played each other once.

Division One 

 — Source: ECB Women's County Championship

Division Two 

 — Source: ECB Women's County Championship

Division Three 

 — Source: ECB Women's County Championship

Division Four

North & East 

 — Source: ECB Women's County Championship

South & West 

 — Source: ECB Women's County Championship

Statistics

Most runs

Source: CricketArchive

Most wickets

Source: CricketArchive

References 

 
2016
2016 in Scottish cricket
2016 in Dutch cricket
cricket
cricket
cricket